Following is a list of Norwegian architects.

A–M

 Arnstein Arneberg (1882-1961)
 George Awsumb (1880-1959)
 Lars Backer (1892-1930)
 Ove Bang (1895-1942)
 Gudolf Blakstad (1893-1985)
 Peter Andreas Blix (1831-1901)
Kari Nissen Brodtkorb (born 1942), architect and educator, Houen Foundation Award for Stranden housing complex in Oslo
 Christian Christie (1832-1906)
 Birgit Cold (born 1936)
 John Engh (1915-1996)
 Sverre Fehn (1924-2009)
 Baltazar Nicolai Garben (1794-1867)
 Christian Heinrich Grosch (1801-1865)
 Lilla Hansen (1872-1962)
 Jan Inge Hovig (1920-1977)
 Tormod Hustad (1889-1973)

 Jacob Christie Kielland (1897-1972)
 Jens Zetlitz Monrad Kielland (1866-1926)
 Kjell Kosberg (born 1953)
 Hans Ditlev Franciscus Linstow (1787-1851)
 Kjell Lund (1927-2013)
 Sigurd Lunde (1874-1936)
 Ivar Lykke (born 1941)
 Herman Munthe-Kaas (1890-1977)

N–Z

 Odd Nansen (1901-1973)
 Johan Henrik Nebelong (1817-1871)
 Christian Norberg-Schulz (1926-2000)
 Olaf Nordhagen (1883-1925)
 Magnus Poulsson (1881-1958)
 Egill Reimers (1878-1946)
Kirsten Sand (1895–1996), first woman to graduate in architecture from the Norwegian Institute of Technology
 Heinrich Ernst Schirmer (1814-1887)
 Knut Selberg (born 1949)
 Holger Sinding-Larsen (1869-1938)
 Kirsten Sinding-Larsen (1898-1978)
 Nils Slaatto (1923-2001)

See also

 Architecture of Norway
 List of architects
 List of Norwegians

Norwegian
Architects